Holtzwihr is a former commune in the Haut-Rhin department in north-eastern France. On 1 January 2016, it was merged into the new commune Porte du Ried. It was also the location of the World War II Battle of Holtzwihr on January 26, 1945, during which US Army Second Lieutenant Audie Murphy of the 3rd Infantry Division, almost single-handedly cut down an advancing German unit, earning the Medal of Honor.

It also has a road named after Audie Murphy, Rue Audie Murphy (see Google Maps).

See also
 Communes of the Haut-Rhin département

References

Former communes of Haut-Rhin